EBU or Ebu may refer to:

 Ebu, a town in Guangdong province in the south of China
 Ebu (album), a 1984 jazz album by Hamiet Bluiett
 Eddy break-up model, in combustion engineering
 Embu language of Kenya and Tanzania
 English Bridge Union, a contract bridge governing body
 European Badminton Union, Badminton Europe
 European Bitterness Units for beer
 European Board of Urology
 European Boxing Union
 European Broadcasting Union
 European Buddhist Union
 Exim Bank (Uganda)
 Saint-Étienne–Bouthéon Airport near Saint-Étienne, France